Hilda Marion Ada Neatby  (February 19, 1904May 14, 1975) was a Canadian historian and educator.

Early life and education 
Hilda Marion Ada Neatby was born on February 19, 1904, in Sutton (then in Surrey), to Andrew Neatby and Ada Fisher. The family moved to Saskatchewan when Hilda was 2. She received a BA and MA from the University of Saskatchewan and a PhD from the University of Minnesota. She taught history at the University of Saskatchewan and was head of the history department from 1958 to 1969. Fluent in French, she studied at the Sorbonne in Paris.

Career 
In 1966, she published Quebec, The Revolutionary Age 1760–1791, part of The Canadian Centenary Series. The book examined the transitional events between 1760 and 1791 in the province of Quebec following victory by British forces over the French Army and the decision made by Louis XV of France to hand over Quebec to the British in the 1763 Treaty of Paris that ended the Seven Years' War.

From 1949 to 1951 she was the only female member of the Royal Commission on National Development in the Arts, Letters and Sciences, which recommended the establishment of the Canada Council.

Her book So Little for the Mind (1953) criticized contemporary reforms in the Canadian educational system that were based on John Dewey’s philosophical ideas.

In 1969, the Board of Trustees at Queen's University in Kingston, Ontario, commissioned Neatby to write the history of that institution. Queen's University, Volume I, 1841-1917: And Not to Yield was published in 1978, after her death.

Neatby died in Saskatoon on May 14, 1975.

Awards and honours 
In 1967, Neatby was made a companion of the Order of Canada. In 1953, she received an honorary degree from the University of Toronto. Since 1982, the Canadian Historical Association has awarded the Hilda Neatby Prize for works on women's history. In 2000, Canada Post issued a stamp in her honour. In 2005, the former Place Riel Theatre (a former cinema, later converted into a lecture theatre) at the University of Saskatchewan was renamed the Neatby-Timlin Theatre, in honour of her and former economics professor Mabel Timlin.

Bibliography
So Little for the Mind (1953)
Quebec, The Revolutionary Age 1760–1791 (1966)
The Quebec Act: Protest and Policy  (1972)
Queen's University, Volume 1: 1841–1917: To Strive, to Seek, to Find, and Not to Yield (1978)
So Much to Do, So Little Time-the Writings of Hilda Neatby (1983)

Citations

Works cited 
 

1904 births
1975 deaths
20th-century Canadian historians
20th-century Canadian women writers
Canadian women historians
Companions of the Order of Canada
Historians of Canada
Academic staff of the Queen's University at Kingston
People from Surrey
Presidents of the Canadian Historical Association
University of Minnesota alumni
University of Paris alumni
University of Saskatchewan alumni
Academic staff of the University of Saskatchewan
Writers from Saskatchewan
British emigrants to Canada